Karim Alfredo Saab Pomonti (born 11 January 2001) is a Venezuelan professional footballer who plays as a right-back for Venezuelan club Mineros.

Career statistics

Club

References

External links 
 

2001 births
Living people
People from Bolívar (state)
Venezuelan footballers
Association football fullbacks
A.C.C.D. Mineros de Guayana players
Venezuelan Primera División players
21st-century Venezuelan people